Stress is a bimonthly peer-reviewed medical journal covering research on stress in terms of: the mechanisms of stressful stimulation, the physiological and behavioural responses to stress, and their regulation, in both the short and long term; adaptive mechanisms, and the pathological consequences of stress. This includes research in physiology, neuroscience, molecular biology, genetics, immunology, and behaviour.

The journal is published by Taylor & Francis and the editor-in-chief is James Herman (University of Cincinnati). It was established in 1996 and according to the Journal Citation Reports it has a 2020 impact factor of 3.493.

References

External links 
 

Physiology journals
Taylor & Francis academic journals
English-language journals
Bimonthly journals
Publications established in 1996
Neuroscience journals